Lambert Mascarenhas (17 September 1914 – 27 June 2021) was an Indian journalist, independence activist, and writer from Goa. His family hailed from the Goan Catholic community.

Personal life

Mascarenhas was born in Colva, Portuguese India, but his early education took place in Pune and later at the St. Xavier's College, Mumbai. He was married to Dr. Jolly Mascarenhas. He had four children. He had taken a vow that he would marry only after the liberation of Goa from colonial Portuguese rule. Hence, he married on 29 December 1961, exactly ten days after Goa's liberation by India on 19 December 1961.

Mascarenhas died on 27 June 2021 at the age of 106.

Journalism

Mascarenhas started his career as a journalist in the Morning Standard at Mumbai. He worked as a sub-editor at the Bombay Sentinel, under editor B. G. Horniman. Mascarenhas later joined the Onlooker as an assistant editor. He later edited the Goan Tribune, which espoused the cause of Goa's invasion by India. Upon his return to a liberated Goa in 1961, he joined as the editor of The Navhind Times and later established and edited Goa Today.

Contribution to the independence movement

Mascarenhas also contributed to India's freedom movement. He authored the Goan Tribune, which was dedicated to the cause of Goa's liberation. While at the Goan Tribune, he wrote numerous articles against the Portuguese colonial regime in Goa and caught the attention of both Indian leaders as well as the Portuguese regime. While on a visit to Goa, he was arrested and jailed by the Portuguese for his articles. He was later released on bail and expelled from Goa.  In Bombay, he joined the National Congress (Goa).

Books
Mascarenhas authored several books, including the novel Sorrowing Lies My Land, published in 1955. This work of fiction was based in the anti-Portuguese movement launched by the Indian politician Rammanohar Lohia.

Mascarenhas' other works include The First City, In the Womb of Saudade, The Greater Tragedy and Heartbreak Passage.

Awards

Mascarenhas was awarded the Laxmidas Borkar Memorial Award for journalism for 2004. He was also awarded Goa's highest civilian award, the Gomant Vibhushan. 
He was awarded Padma Shri, the fourth highest civilian award of India, in 2015.

References

External links
 Review of Sorrowing Lies My Land by Francisco Correia-Afonso (in Portuguese)

1914 births
2021 deaths
Goan Catholics
Indian male journalists
Businesspeople from Goa
Journalists from Goa
Indian magazine founders
St. Xavier's College, Mumbai alumni
Indian newspaper editors
Recipients of the Padma Shri in literature & education
Indian centenarians
20th-century Indian journalists
Men centenarians